Counting from 1950 and prior to this election, the Conservatives had held the mayor's position in 67 of the 71 years. Venstre had held it from 2010 to 2013, but lost it to the Conservatives following the 2013 election.

In the 2017 election, the Conservatives had won 10 seats, just one short of an absolute majority. However, they found an agreement with the Social Democrats, and Sofie Osmani could continue for her 2nd term.

In this election, they would however win an absolute majority, and Sofie Osmani was set to win a 4th term.

Electoral system
For elections to Danish municipalities, a number varying from 9 to 31 are chosen to be elected to the municipal council. The seats are then allocated using the D'Hondt method and a closed list proportional representation.
Lyngby-Taarbæk Municipality had 21 seats in 2021

Unlike in Danish General Elections, in elections to municipal councils, electoral alliances are allowed.

Electoral alliances  

Electoral Alliance 1

Electoral Alliance 2

Electoral Alliance 3

Results

Notes

References 

Lyngby-Taarbæk